Grupo Desportivo Renascimento is an Angolan sports club from the northern city of Uíge.

The team currently plays in the Gira Angola, the Angolan second division championship.

Achievements
Angolan League: 0

Angolan Cup: 0

Angolan SuperCup: 0

Gira Angola: 0

League & Cup Positions

Manager history

Players

See also
Girabola

References

External links
 
 

Football clubs in Angola
Sports clubs in Angola